Yang Chin-yi (born 15 May 1981) is a Taiwanese weightlifter.

At the 2004 Summer Olympics he participated in the 56 kg category, but did not finish.

He competed in Weightlifting at the 2008 Summer Olympics in the 56 kg division representing Chinese Taipei finishing fourth overall with a personal best combined lift of 285 kg. His previous best was 277.5 kg.

Notes and references

External links
 NBC profile 
 Athlete Biography YANG Chin-Yi at beijing2008

1981 births
Living people
Weightlifters at the 2000 Summer Olympics
Weightlifters at the 2004 Summer Olympics
Weightlifters at the 2008 Summer Olympics
Olympic weightlifters of Taiwan
Asian Games medalists in weightlifting
Weightlifters at the 1998 Asian Games
Weightlifters at the 2002 Asian Games
Weightlifters at the 2014 Asian Games
Taiwanese male weightlifters
Asian Games bronze medalists for Chinese Taipei
Medalists at the 2002 Asian Games
21st-century Taiwanese people